The Vijay for Best Music Director is given by STAR Vijay as part of its annual Vijay Awards ceremony for Tamil  (Kollywood) films.

The list
Here is a list of the award winners and the films for which they won.

Nominations
2007 A. R. Rahman - Sivaji
G. V. Prakash Kumar - Kireedam
Harris Jayaraj - Unnale Unnale
Vidyasagar - Mozhi
Yuvan Shankar Raja - Paruthiveeran
2008 Harris Jayaraj - Vaaranam Aayiram
 A. R. Rahman - Sakkarakatti
 James Vasanthan - Subramaniapuram
 Yuvan Shankar Raja - Saroja
2009 Harris Jayaraj - Aadhavan
Devi Sri Prasad - Kanthaswamy
Ilaiyaraaja - Naan Kadavul
Vijay Antony - TN 07 AL 4777
Yuvan Shankar Raja - Siva Manasula Sakthi
2010 A. R. Rahman - Vinnaithaandi Varuvaayaa
D. Imman - Mynaa
G. V. Prakash Kumar - Madrasapattinam
Ilaiyaraaja - Nandalala
Rahnananthan - Thenmerku Paruvakaatru
Yuvan Shankar Raja - Paiyaa
 2011 G. V. Prakash Kumar - Aadukalam
 C. Sathya - Engaeyum Eppothum
 Harris Jayaraj - Engeyum Kadhal
 Sharreth - Nootrenbadhu
 Ghibran - Vaagai Sooda Vaa
 2012 D Imman - Kumki
 Anirudh Ravichander - 3
 Harris Jayaraj - Nanban
 Ilaiyaraja - Neethaane En Ponvasantham
 Yuvan Shankar Raja - Kazhugu
 2013 A. R. Rahman - Kadal
 Anirudh Ravichander - Ethir Neechal
 D Imman - Varuthapadatha Valibar Sangam
 G. V. Prakash Kumar - Raja Rani
 Santhosh Narayanan - Soodhu Kavvum
 2014 Anirudh Ravichander - Velaiyilla Pattathari
A. R. Rahman - Kochadaiiyaan
D. Imman - Jilla
Santhosh Narayanan - Cuckoo
Yuvan Shankar Raja - Anjaan

See also
 Tamil cinema
 Cinema of India

References

Music Director